Ahmed Fouad Nessim (19 September 1924 – 28 October 1956) is an Egyptian water polo player. He competed at the 1948 Summer Olympics and the 1952 Summer Olympics.

He was given the honour to carry the national flag of Egypt at the opening ceremony of the 1952 Summer Olympics in Helsinki, becoming the seventh water polo player to be a flag bearer at the opening and closing ceremonies of the Olympics. Nessim died in a plane crash in the Mediterranean Sea in 1956.

See also
 Egypt men's Olympic water polo team records and statistics
 List of men's Olympic water polo tournament goalkeepers

References

External links
 

1924 births
1956 deaths
Egyptian male water polo players
Water polo goalkeepers
Olympic water polo players of Egypt
Water polo players at the 1948 Summer Olympics
Water polo players at the 1952 Summer Olympics
Place of birth missing
Victims of aviation accidents or incidents in international waters
Victims of aviation accidents or incidents in 1956
20th-century Egyptian people